Kuwait Sports Club is a Kuwaiti professional football club based in Kuwait City. The football team has won Kuwaiti Premier League 17 times. Kuwait SC also has over 50 trophies in Kuwaiti Club football history. Kuwait SC plays in the Al Kuwait Sports Club Stadium located in Kaifan, which is the 5th largest stadium in Kuwait. It is the first Kuwaiti club to ever win an Asian title, winning the 2009 AFC Cup, 2012 AFC Cup and 2013 AFC Cup.

History
Kuwait SC is the oldest football club in Kuwait, the first to be founded after independence. The club is also called "Al Kuwait" and Al Ameed, which translates to "the oldest club in the nation". Members of the club during the 1980s formed a part of the Kuwaiti team which reached the FIFA World Cup 1982. The second golden age for the club was in 2000s, as they have been winning most of the league titles, and participating in AFC Cup. In 2009, Kuwait has won the first AFC Cup winning against Al-Karamah from Syria with 2-1. In 2011, they reach the AFC Cup final but they lost against Nasaf Qarshi from Uzbekistan.They won another two AFC Cup trophies in 2012 and 2013 defeating Arbil from Iraq with 4-0 and Al-Qasdia from Kuwait.

Achievements

Domestic
STC Premier League:
Winners (17): 1964–65, 1967–68, 1971–72, 1973–74, 1976–77, 1978–79, 2000–01, 2005–06, 2006–07, 2007–08, 2012–13, 2014–15, 2016–17, 2017–18, 2018–19, 2019–20, 2021–22
Runners-up (11): 1969–70, 1974–75, 1975–76, 1984–85, 1987–88, 2004–05, 2009–10, 2010–11, 2011–12, 2013–14
Kuwait Emir Cup:
Winners (15): 1976, 1977, 1978, 1980, 1985, 1987, 1988, 2002, 2009, 2013–14, 2015–16, 2016–17, 2017–18, 2018–19, 2020–21
Runners-up (10): 1963, 1969, 1971, 1975, 1981, 1982, 2004, 2010, 2011, 2020
Kuwait Crown Prince Cup:
Winners (9): 1994, 2003, 2008, 2010, 2011, 2016–17, 2018–19, 2019–20, 2020–21
Runners-up (8): 2002, 2004, 2005, 2006, 2009, 2014–2015, 2015–2016, 2017–2018, 2021–2022
Kuwait Super Cup:
Winners (5): 2010, 2015, 2016, 2017, 2020
Runners-up (6): 2008, 2009, 2013, 2014, 2018, 2019, 2021
Kuwait Federation Cup:
Winners (5): 1977–78, 1991–92, 2009–10, 2011–12, 2014–15 
Runners-up (2): 2008, 2015–16
Al Kurafi Cup: (defunct)
Winners (1): 2005
 Kuwait Joint League: 2 (defunct)
 Winners (2): 1976–77, 1988–89

Asian
AFC Cup:
Winners (3): 2009, 2012, 2013
Runners-up (1): 2011

Friendly

Bani Yas International Tournament:
Winners (1): 2012

Statistics in Asian football
 AFC Champions League: 7 appearances
2002–03: Qualifying West – 2nd Round
2005: Group stage
2007: Group stage
2008: Group stage
2014: 3rd Round Qualifying
2019: 2nd qualifying round
2020: 2nd qualifying round

AFC Cup: 10 appearances
2009: Winners
2010: Round of 16
2011: Runners-up
2012: Winners
2013: Winners
2014: Quarter-finals
2015: Semi-finals
2019: Group stage
2020: Canceled
2021: Semi-finals (final zone-west)

 Asian Club Championship: 1 appearance
2002: Group stage (Top 8)

Players

First team squad

Presidents and managers

List of presidents

List of managers

Other sports
Besides football, the club has teams for handball, basketball, volleyball, water polo, squash, athletics, gymnastics, swimming, boxing, judo, and weightlifting. The club has also maintained a monthly magazine since 2007.

Club sponsors
 Wataniya Telecom
 Platinum
 BMW

References

External links

Kuwait SC at Soccerway

 
Kuwait Kaifan
Kuwait Kaifan
Association football clubs established in 1960
1960 establishments in Kuwait
Sports teams in Kuwait
AFC Cup winning clubs